Abaturovo is a rural locality (a village) in Krasnopolyanskoye Rural Settlement, Nikolsky District, Vologda Oblast, Russia. The population was 165 as of 2002. There are 13 streets.

Geography 
Abaturovo is located 3 km northeast of Nikolsk (the district's administrative centre) by road. Irdanovo is the nearest rural locality.

Ethnicity 
The village is inhabited by Russians and others.

References 

Rural localities in Nikolsky District, Vologda Oblast